Nicolaes van Loo (1607 – 1641), was a Dutch Golden Age brewer from Haarlem, best known today for his portrait by Frans Hals.

Biography

He was born in Haarlem as the oldest son of the brewer Johan Claesz Loo and Margriet Akersloot. Their family brewery was situated in the Vissersbocht on the Spaarne river and was called De Drie Lelien. Nicolaes' brother Cornelis became mayor of Haarlem and his sister Risje married the son of the mayor of Delft, Florens Pieter van der Houff. Nicolaes was destined to inherit the family business, and in expectation of a merger with another local brewery, in 1640 he married Aletta Hannemans, the rich widow of the brewer Jacob Pietersz Olycan, but he died the following year, leaving his widow to carry on the business without him.

References

Collections of Paintings in Haarlem: 1572–1745, by Pieter Biesboer (editor Carol Togneri), Getty Trust Publications, Los Angeles, 2001

1607 births
1641 deaths
Dutch businesspeople
Businesspeople from Haarlem
Frans Hals
Frans Hals Museum
Dutch brewers